Chambly may refer to:

Places
 Chambly, Quebec, a city in Quebec, Canada
 Chambly (electoral district),  a defunct federal electoral district in Quebec, Canada, replaced by Chambly-Borduas
 Chambly—Borduas, a defunct federal electoral district in Quebec, Canada
 Chambly (provincial electoral district), a provincial electoral district in Quebec
 Chambly, Oise, a commune in France
 Bassin-de-Chambly (English: Chambly Basin), a waterbody formed by an enlargement of the Richelieu River in Montérégie, Quebec, Canada

Schools
Chambly Academy, a high school in Saint-Lambert Quebec
Chambly County High School, a former high school in Saint-Lambert, Quebec